The Green Cemetery is a historic family cemetery in rural southwestern Ouachita County, Arkansas. It is a small and somewhat overgrown plot, containing eighteen marked graves, all for members of the extended Green (or Greene) family, who were early settlers to the area. The oldest marked grave is dated 1853, and the last is dated 1909. The stone markers include works by James Reynolds and John Stroud, both of New Orleans.

The cemetery was listed on the National Register of Historic Places in 2000.

See also
 National Register of Historic Places listings in Ouachita County, Arkansas

References

External links
 

Cemeteries on the National Register of Historic Places in Arkansas
Buildings and structures completed in 1855
Buildings and structures in Camden, Arkansas
1855 establishments in Arkansas
Protected areas of Ouachita County, Arkansas
National Register of Historic Places in Ouachita County, Arkansas
Cemeteries established in the 1850s